Dis-moi is a 1980 documentary film directed by Chantal Akerman. 
It was commissioned for French TV. Akerman interviews elderly ladies, who are Jewish survivors of the Holocaust.

References

External links
 Dis-Moi at Ina.fr 
 

1980 films
French documentary films
Films directed by Chantal Akerman
Documentary films about the Holocaust
1980s French films